Sermitsiaq is a 1210 meters (3,970 ft) tall Greenlandic mountain in the district of Nuuk in the Kommuneqarfik Sermersooq.

Location 

The mountain is located in the center of its namesake island and 15 km north-east of Nuuk, the capital of Greenland, in the Nuup Kangerlua. Its summit is crowned by a sharp west-east ridge, from which three summit points emerge. These resemble a saddle, which gave the mountain and the island its Danish name. While its south side is shaped by steep rock formations, its north side is covered with glaciers. It also harbors a waterfall which is a tourist attraction.

Due to its distinctive shape the mountain is Nuuk's most prominent landmark, incorporated into its flag. The Sermitsiaq, one of two national newspapers in Greenland, is named after the mountain.

See also
List of mountains in Greenland

References 

Mountains of Greenland